Sir  John Henry Bremridge (彭勵治爵士), KBE, JP (12 July 1925 – 6 May 1994) was Financial Secretary of Hong Kong from 1981 to 1986. He was the first Financial Secretary who was not a civil servant.

Early life

Bremridge was born in 1925 in Transvaal, in what was then the Union of South Africa to British parents (his father was Godfrey Bremridge) on an orange farm, but left in 1933 for Britain where he grew up.

Career

He served in the British Army (Rifle Brigade (Prince Consort's Own)) during World War II (1943-1947), read law at Oxford before joining Swire in 1949 where he rose as was a senior member of staff in the John Swire and Sons (Hong Kong) (Swire Group) and held various corporate boards:

 Chairman, Swire Pacific Limited 1973-1980
 Chairman, Cathay Pacific Airways Limited 1973-1980
 Non-executive Director, Schroders plc 1987-1989
 Director, John Swire and Sons 1987

Hong Kong Government

In the 1980s he left the private sector to become Financial Secretary and remained until 1986 to return to the corporate world. During his tenure, he experienced the economic uncertainties that stemmed from the Sino-British negotiations that led to the signing of the Sino-British Joint Declaration. In order to stabilise the economy, he pegged the Hong Kong dollar to the United States dollar at a rate of HK$7.8 to US$1, thus instituting the linked exchange rate system in Hong Kong. Both Bremridge and his successor Piers Jacobs considered introducing a Sales Tax but had failed. 

He contributed to the growth restrictions imposed on Dragonair, the second Hong Kong-based airline at that time, by introducing a “one route, one carrier” policy aimed at maintaining Cathay Pacific’s local monopoly. Due to this policy, Dragonair shifted its focus to unserved secondary mainland China markets.

Later life

Bremridge's health suffered after a fall in 1987 and never fully recovered, dying in 1994 in London. He was survived by his wife and children (Anne, Elizabeth, Charles and Henry.

References

British expatriates in Hong Kong
Financial Secretaries of Hong Kong
Government officials of Hong Kong
Knights Commander of the Order of the British Empire
Swire Group
1925 births
1994 deaths
HK LegCo Members 1985–1988
Hong Kong people of British descent
Members of the Executive Council of Hong Kong
Schroders people